Albert James Young (May 31, 1939 – April 17, 2021) was an American poet, novelist, essayist, screenwriter, and professor. He was named Poet Laureate of California by Governor Arnold Schwarzenegger from 2005 to 2008. Young's many books included novels, collections of poetry, essays, and memoirs. His work appeared in literary journals and magazines including Paris Review, Ploughshares, Essence, The New York Times, Chicago Review, Seattle Review, Brilliant Corners: A Journal of Jazz & Literature, Chelsea, Rolling Stone, Gathering of the Tribes, and in anthologies including the Norton Anthology of African American Literature, and the Oxford Anthology of African American Literature.

Early life
Born May 31, 1939, in Ocean Springs, Mississippi, on the Gulf Coast near Biloxi. His maternal grandparents had been sharecroppers. Young attended the "Kingston School for Colored", a segregated school in the South. He graduated in 1957 from Central High School in Detroit.

From 1957 to 1960 he attended the University of Michigan. At the University of Michigan he co-edited Generation, the campus literary magazine. He also met classmate Janet Coleman in Michigan, whom he later co-authored work with in 1989.

In 1961 he moved to the San Francisco Bay Area. Settling at first in Berkeley, California, he held a wide variety of jobs (including folksinger, lab aide, disk jockey, medical photographer, clerk typist, employment counselor). He graduated with honors in 1969 from University of California, Berkeley (UC Berkeley), with a degree in Spanish.

Career and teaching
Young taught poetry, fiction writing and American literature at UC Berkeley; University of California, Santa Cruz from 1983 until the early 1990s; University of California, Davis; Bowling Green State University; Foothill College; the Colorado College; Rice University; the University of Washington; the University of Michigan; and the University of Arkansas.

From 1969 to 1976, he was Edward B. Jones Lecturer in Creative Writing at Stanford University near Palo Alto, where he lived and worked for three decades.

In the 1970s, he wrote film scripts Joseph Strick, Sidney Poitier, Bill Cosby, and Richard Pryor. He also wrote linear notes for George Benson’s Breezin' album (1976).

In 2002, he was appointed the San José State University's Lurie Distinguished Professor of Creative Writing.

He also taught at Charles University in the Czech Republic under the auspices of the Prague Summer Programs. In the spring of 2003 he taught poetry at Davidson College (Davidson, NC), where he was McGee Professor in Writing. In the fall of 2003, as the first Coffey Visiting Professor of Creative Writing at Appalachian State University in Boone, NC, he taught a poetry workshop. From 2003 to 2006, he served on the faculty of Cave Canem's summer workshop retreats for African-American poets.

His students included poet Persis Karim.

Honors and awards
In 1974, Young was awarded a Guggenheim fellowship in fiction. He was also awarded a Fulbright fellowship, two Puschart prizes, the PEN-USA Award, multiple National Endowment for the Arts fellowships, and a Wallace Stegner fellowship. He twice received the American Book Award, for Bodies and Soul: Musical Memoirs (1982), and The Sound of Dreams Remembered: Poems 1990–2000 (2002).

In the 1980s and 1990s, as a cultural ambassador for the United States Information Agency, he traveled throughout South Asia, Egypt, Jordan, Israel and the Palestinian West Bank.

In 2001, he traveled to the Persian Gulf to lecture on American and African-American literature and culture in Kuwait and in Bahrain for the U.S. Department of State. Subsequent lecture tours took him to Southern Italy in 2004, and to Italy in 2005. His poetry and prose have been translated into Italian, Spanish, Swedish, Norwegian, Serbo-Croatian, Polish, Chinese, Japanese, Russian, German, Urdu, Korean, and other languages. Blending story, recitation and song, Young often performed with musicians.

On May 15, 2005, he was named Poet Laureate of California by Governor Arnold Schwarzenegger. In appointing Young as Poet Laureate in 2005, the Governor Schwarzenegger praised him: "He is an educator and a man with a passion for the Arts. His remarkable talent and sense of mission to bring poetry into the lives of Californians is an inspiration." Muriel Johnson, Director of the California Arts Council declared: "Like jazz, Al Young is an original American voice."

In 2009, Young was awarded an honorary Doctorate of Humane Letters (L.H.D.) from Whittier College.

Family life and death
He was married to technical writer and editor Arline June Young (née Belch) from 1963 until her death in 2016. The couple had one child, a son named Michael.  After living in Palo Alto from 1969 to 1999, in 2000 Young returned to Berkeley, where he continued to freelance.

In February 2019, Young suffered a stroke. He died of complications of the stroke on April 17, 2021, in Concord, California, aged 81.

Published works

Poetry collections, full-length

Chapbooks

Musical memoirs

Novels

Collaborations 
 Jazz Idiom: blueprints, stills, and frames: the jazz photography of Charles L. Robinson (photographs and comments by Charles L. Robinson, poetic takes and riffs by Al Young, Heyday Books, 2008)

Anthologies edited 
 The Literature of California, Volume 1: Native American Beginnings to 1945 (with Jack Hicks, James D. Houston and Maxine Hong Kingston, eds., University of California Press, 2000)
 African American Literature: A Brief Introduction and Anthology (HarperCollins College Publishers, 1996)
 Yardbird Lives! (co-edited with Ishmael Reed, Grove Press, 1978)

Screenplays 
 Sparkle (1972), for the Robert Stigwood Organisation (RSO)
 Nigger (1972), for Joseph Strick and Laser Films, Inc., based on Dick Gregory's autobiography
 A Piece of the Action (1977), for Sidney Poitier and Verdon Productions, starring Bill Cosby
 Bustin' Loose (1981), starring Richard Pryor, Cicely Tyson

References

External links 
 

1939 births
2021 deaths
20th-century African-American writers
20th-century American essayists
20th-century American male writers
20th-century American novelists
20th-century American poets
21st-century African-American people
African-American male writers
African-American novelists
African-American poets
American Book Award winners
American male essayists
American male novelists
American male poets
English-language poets
Novelists from Mississippi
PEN Oakland/Josephine Miles Literary Award winners
People from Ocean Springs, Mississippi
Poets from California
Poets from Mississippi
Poets Laureate of California
Rice University staff
Stanford University faculty
Symbols of California
UC Berkeley College of Letters and Science alumni
University of Michigan alumni
Writers from the San Francisco Bay Area
Writers from Palo Alto, California
Writers from Berkeley, California
Fulbright alumni